Fernando Mendes (15 September 1946 – 2 October 2001) was a Portuguese cyclist.

Major results

1966
 9th Overall Volta a Portugal
1st Stage 9
1967
 3rd Road race, National Road Championships
 4th Overall Volta a Portugal
1968
 1st Stage 5 Volta a Portugal
 2nd Porto–Lisboa
1969
 2nd Porto–Lisboa
 6th Overall Volta a Portugal
1st Stage 6
1970
 2nd Overall Volta a Portugal
1st Stages 8a & 9
1971
 2nd Road race, National Road Championships
1972
 3rd Overall Volta a Portugal
 3rd Road race, National Road Championships
1973
 1st Porto–Lisboa
 2nd Overall Volta a Portugal
1st Stages 3 & 4
 4th Overall Vuelta a Aragón
1974
 National Road Championships
1st  Road race
1st  Time trial
 1st  Overall Volta a Portugal
1st Stages 11 & 15b
1975
 National Road Championships
1st  Road race
1st  Time trial
 1st  National Cyclo-cross Championships
 1st Overall Rapport Toer
1st Stages 2, 11 & 16
 5th Overall Vuelta a Aragón
 6th Overall Vuelta a España
1977
 2nd Overall Vuelta a los Valles Mineros
1978
 1st  Road race, National Road Championships
 1st Stage 11 Volta a Portugal
 2nd Overall Volta ao Algarve
1st Stage 2
1979
 6th Overall Volta ao Algarve
1981
 4th Overall Route du Sud
 4th Grand Prix de Cannes

References

1946 births
2001 deaths
Portuguese male cyclists
S.L. Benfica (cycling)
Volta a Portugal winners
Sportspeople from Santa Maria da Feira